Ludovic Ajorque (born 25 February 1994) is a French professional footballer who plays as a forward for Bundesliga club Mainz 05.

Developed at Angers, where he made only one Coupe de la Ligue appearance, he played for two years with Clermont in Ligue 2 before a €1.5 million move to Ligue 1 team Strasbourg in 2018. He has played over 130 times for Strasbourg, scoring over 40 goals and winning the Coupe de la Ligue in 2019.

Club career

Early career
Ajorque began his career at AS Excelsior on his native island before moving to Angers SCO, where he played mainly for the reserve team in the fifth tier. His sole game for Angers was on 12 August 2014 in the first round of the Coupe de la Ligue, playing the first 57 minutes of a 2–1 home win over Nîmes.

In July 2016, following a season on loan at Luçon in the Championnat National, Ajorque transferred to Ligue 2 club Clermont on a three-year deal. After 14 goals in 37 games in 2017–18, he signed a four-year deal at Strasbourg in Ligue 1. The transfer fee was €1.5 million.

Strasbourg
Ajorque made his top-flight debut on 12 August 2018, starting as the season began with a 2–0 win at Bordeaux, and scored the first of his nine goals on 1 September to open a 3–2 home loss to Nantes. The following 19 January, he scored twice in a 5–1 win at Monaco, and added another brace on 9 March as the team came from behind to draw with Lyon at the Stade de la Meinau.

In the 2018–19 Coupe de la Ligue, Ajorque played four games and scored twice as the Alsatians won the trophy for the first time in 14 years. His penalty opened a 2–1 win at Lyon in the quarter-finals on 8 January, and he equalised in a 3–2 home win over Bordeaux three weeks later. With this result, the team entered the UEFA Europa League, where he scored in each leg of a 4–3 aggregate win over Maccabi Haifa.

In June 2020, Ajorque extended his contract until 2024. In the ensuing season, in which his team finished two points above the relegation play-offs, he scored 16 goals in 35 games; this put him joint fourth behind Kylian Mbappé, Wissam Ben Yedder and Memphis Depay. In 2021–22, his 12 goals put him in 10th. On 7 November, he was sent off for the first time in his career for a foul on Fábio in a 2–2 draw at Nantes.

Mainz 05
On 24 January 2023, Ajorque signed for Bundesliga club Mainz 05 for an undisclosed fee, signing a three-and-a-half year contract.

International career
Born in Réunion, Ajorque is of Malagasy descent and was approached to join the Madagascar national team in March 2018. He has said he wants to concentrate on club football.

Career statistics

Honours 
Strasbourg
 Coupe de la Ligue: 2018–19

References

External links

 Profile at the 1. FSV Mainz 05 website 
 

1994 births
Living people
Sportspeople from Saint-Denis, Réunion
Footballers from Réunion
Association football forwards
French footballers
French sportspeople of Malagasy descent
Ligue 1 players
Ligue 2 players
Championnat National players
Championnat National 3 players
Angers SCO players
Vendée Poiré-sur-Vie Football players
Luçon FC players
Clermont Foot players
RC Strasbourg Alsace players
1. FSV Mainz 05 players
French expatriate footballers
Expatriate footballers in Germany
French expatriate sportspeople in Germany